Charles McCabe (1915–1983) was a columnist for the San Francisco Chronicle from the mid-1950s until his death May 1, 1983 at the age of 68.

His writing
McCabe started as a police reporter for the New York American in 1936 and later worked for the Puerto Rico World-Journal, United Press and The San Francisco Examiner before joining the Chronicle in the mid-1950s.

McCabe wrote a book called Tall Girls are Grateful which humorously reflected upon his love/hate relationship with women, and another called The Good Man's Weakness recording his wry thoughts on drinking, the other love/hate relationship in his life. Another book was a biography of his grandfather-in-law, the newspaper man, E. W. Scripps, who was also principal founder and supporter of the Scripps Institution of Oceanography and the Scripps Foundation.
There is also a compilation of his essays put together in the book The Fearless Spectator by Chronicle Books (1970)

His newspaper column
McCabe was renowned in San Francisco for his satirical newspaper column in the Chronicle under the byline "The Fearless Spectator", and for his robust social life centered on the many "watering holes" he frequented.

While at the Chronicle, his boss Scott Newhall assigned him to do a column for the sports section of the newspaper. McCabe knew little about sports and had virtually no interest in the subject. Newhall dubbed him the "fearless spectator" and took publicity photographs of McCabe perched on a shooting stick, wearing a derby and looking bored. Initially the column was placed in the sports section but having little if anything to do with sports it was eventually moved to the features section. A black and white icon of McCabe in the bowler hat always sat next to the title of his column "The Fearless Spectator".

McCabe would arrive at the Chronicle offices at 5th and Mission at what his colleagues called the "ungodly hour" of 8AM. He would feverishly type up his column and then leave before 9AM to get his breakfast of five or six "Green Deaths" at Gino and Carlo, a bar in San Francisco's North Beach neighborhood.

His replies to letters from his readers
McCabe professed little interest in what his readers wrote to him. His editorial assistant, Mike Brown, would write touching or apologetic replies to most if not all of the letters. It is interesting that many people still remember the beautiful letters and indicate that the letters formed their opinion about McCabe yet he never read nor wrote any of them.

Political views
McCabe as previously noted was a satirical journalist. While there were sometimes underlying political implications in his columns, it was not common. In the late 1950s, US Steel proposed to build a huge building (the US Steel Tower) near the Embarcadero and towering 80 feet higher than the West Tower of the nearby Bay Bridge. Both McCabe and Herb Caen, another SF Chronicle columnist, took strong stances against its construction. The project was eventually abandoned.

His watering holes
McCabe was a frequent imbiber at his favorite bar Gino and Carlo, in North Beach where he enjoyed his Rainer ale (AKA "Green Death"); at Mooney's Irish Pub for the Irish whiskey and conversation; and sometimes at Deno and Carlo's bar, also in North Beach for the dark beer, music, and a monthly get together with his friend Ron Small.

Green Death
Green Death was the nickname for Ranier Ale. This was McCabe's favorite beer and he often wrote about his fondness for the brew in his column.

After his death, his friend Denis Prescott poured a bottle of the brew over the side of the passenger liner the S.S. Santa Maria in memory of McCabe. McCabe traveled on the Santa Maria frequently and was well known and liked by the ship's crew. They stopped the ship and announced the event just prior to the ceremonial pouring

Chocolate Surprise
"I went to Dino and Carlo's bar in North Beach every so often with my friend Ron Small. Ron would frequently meet there with an older guy who I was told worked at the SF Chronicle and on one occasion this Mr. Charles McCabe and I were sitting there waiting for Ron to arrive.

Ron eventually showed up accompanied with the scruftiest looking person I had ever seen. This other guy looked like a unwashed biker. He wore a helmet that reminded me of a Nazi WW2 military helmet. The Grateful Dead were becoming popular around this time and I flashed that this must be "PigPen" from their band. I moaned "good god" Mr. McCabe said nothing just looked amused.

Ron introduced our latest friend as George. Upon closer inspection he was neither dirty nor scruffy, just unshaved. McCabe asked what he was drinking. Ron quickly said - "like you Charlie, he doesn't like the beer here - I bring stuff for him" and pulled out a quart container of chocolate milk.

George thanked Ron, quaffed down a good pint and then we all began to talk. Later I learned this was the Hell's Angel biker Chocolate George. I also learned that the milk carton contained only half chocolate milk and the other half some unspecified hard stuff.

McCabe said that there was now a new name among the drinks that he might write about. First "Green Death" and now "Chocolate Surprise".

His family
McCabe had four children with Peggy Scripps McCabe: Margaret Ellen "Nini" McCabe, Charles K. McCabe, Peter McCabe, and Mary Pierce.

His death
Charles McCabe was found dead on May 1, 1983 in his San Francisco apartment by his daughter. He had apparently tripped and hit his head while falling. He died of a severe concussion

His obituary
More than 400 friends, colleagues and faithful readers gathered at St. Francis of Assisi Church in North Beach on May 4 for a final farewell to Charles McCabe, the stylish essayist who wrote a popular column for the Chronicle for nearly 25 years. The Mass of Resurrection was celebrated by his friend John M. Ring, pastor of Our Lady of Carmel Church in Mill Valley, who praised the writer for having "a restless heart and mind and spirit, which were his greatest gifts." "Charles couldn't stand anything phony, whether it be presidents, governors, oily-tongued clergymen or razor blades," the priest told a group that included socialites, journalists and many blue-collar drinking buddies. The Mass was planned in accordance with McCabe's will, in which he asked that the music at his funeral include Bach's "Sheep May Safely Graze" and that three Shakespeare sonnets be read by his friend and attorney, Carlos Bea.

Notable quotes
McCabe was also known for his satirical sayings. One of his more notable quotes was "Any clod can have the facts, but having opinions is an art."
 Another was "McCabe's Law: Nobody has to do anything."

His colleagues
"This was a sort of "golden age" at the Chronicle. Pulitzer Prize winners Herb Caen and Stanton Delaplane along with Art Hoppe and Charles McCabe
wonderful columnists all, were writing for the Chronicle at the same time. While I was fortunate to have known both Charlie and Herb, I wasn't their colleague, just a brash youngster"

References

American male journalists
20th-century American journalists
1915 births
1983 deaths
San Francisco Chronicle people
20th-century American non-fiction writers
20th-century American male writers
American Roman Catholics